Amar Bodyguard (or sometimes Aamar Bodyguard) is a 2013 Bengali film directed by Haranath Chakraborty and produced under the banner of Yoshi Films. The film stars actor and Pratik in the lead role. The film was released on 29 March 2013, though the filming was completed by 2009. Ridhima and Pratik were supposed to be debutants in this film, but due to the delayed release, both of them have appeared in numerous films in between.

Plot
Anol (Naziur Rahman) is a philanthropist who spends his time doing good deeds and helping out people. One day he comes across Ankhi, a spoilt urchin who thinks of money. From that moment they become inseparable and they always go together to all places. It seemed as if that Ankhi loved Anol, but actually, she didn't. On the other hand, Anol (Hamidur- the protagonist of the film) fell in love with her and later on, one day, Anol confessed his love for her. But, in reply, Ankhi said that she was just playing a game with him and that he was just like her bodyguard, whom she took everywhere with her for her own safety. However, Anol's love was able to change Ankhi's mindset. In the meantime, Ankhi's fiancé, Jayanta (Arka) tries to kill Anol by employing goons and Anal is arrested on false charges. Afterwards, the charges were reversed when it was revealed that Jayanta was the culprit. The film ends as Jayanta is arrested and Ankhi goes back to Anol. Ankhi is helped by Anol who helps her get over her mistakes.

Cast

 Pratik Sen as Anol
 Tapas Paul as Police officer
 Kanchan Mullick as Jayanta
 Riddhima Ghosh as Ankhi
Sumit Ganguly as Sub inspector
Goutam ChakrabortyDance choreographer
 Anjan Mahato as Police constable

Soundtrack

References

2010s Bengali-language films
Bengali-language Indian films
Films directed by Haranath Chakraborty